is a Japanese politician of the Liberal Democratic Party, a member of the House of Representatives in the Diet (national legislature). A native of Tahara, Aichi and graduate of Chuo University, he was elected to the House of Representatives for the first time in 2005 after serving in the Aichi Prefectural Assembly for two terms.

References

External links 
 Official website in Japanese.

1951 births
Living people
People from Tahara, Aichi
Politicians from Aichi Prefecture
Members of the Aichi Prefectural Assembly
Chuo University alumni
Koizumi Children
Members of the House of Representatives (Japan)
Liberal Democratic Party (Japan) politicians